The 1974 Roller Hockey World Cup was the twenty-first roller hockey world cup, organized by the Fédération Internationale de Roller Sports. It was contested by 12 national teams (8 from Europe, 2 from South America, 1 from North America and 1 from Oceania). All the games were played in the city of Lisbon, in Portugal, the chosen city to host the World Cup.

Results

Standings

See also
 FIRS Roller Hockey World Cup

External links
 1974 World Cup in rink-hockey.net historical database

Roller Hockey World Cup
International roller hockey competitions hosted by Portugal
1974 in Portuguese sport
1974 in roller hockey
1970s in Lisbon